The Des Moines City Hall is a government building in Des Moines, Iowa, built in 1909 and 1910. It was individually listed on the National Register of Historic Places on November 10, 1977 as the Municipal Building, and became a contributing property in the Civic Center Historic District in 1988. The building serves as the seat for the government of the city of Des Moines. Beginning April 7, 2016, City Hall offices were temporarily relocated while the building underwent renovation. The construction was necessary to install modern heating, cooling, and sprinkler systems while preserving the historic character of the building. The project was expected to take 18–24 months. During that time, City Hall was closed to the public, and City offices moved to other nearby locations. Between February 26, 2018 and April 9, 2018, city offices moved back to City Hall.

History
From 1851 to 1870, the city council met in churches, schools, homes and stores. In that time period, the population of the city grew from 1,500 to more than 12,000. The city council approved the construction of a two-room log building in 1869 to serve the needs of the fire department and city business. It was built the following year at the corner of Second and Walnut Streets.

In ten years the city's population grew by another 10,000 people. In 1880, the city council decided to build a new city hall and a separate building for the police and fire departments next door. It was built in 1882 on the corner of Locust Street and Second Avenue. The city failed to maintain the building adequately, and it was too small to serve its needs, a new building was needed.

Des Moines had also grown in size. Its population was 86,000 in 1910 and it covered 65 square miles. In 1907, the city council decided to construct a new city hall. A location was chosen on the east side of the Des Moines River between Grand Avenue and Locust Street. A new bridge on Locust Street was planned to open in 1909. Streets in the area had also been raised 3–4 feet to lessen the impact of flooding.

The Des Moines architectural firm Proudfoot & Bird was hired to design the new structure. Because of recent corruption in city politics, they were tasked to design a building that would define an open and honest government. It was also to be large enough to house all city departments except the fire department. The building should also allow citizens to see and hear city business being transacted. To help create a new image, the building's name was to be called the Municipal Building rather than city hall.

Legal challenges to a bond referendum were made in 1907 and 1908. A referendum was passed by voters in April 1908. But because women were forbidden to vote Mary J. Coggeshall sued the city for the right of women to vote based on an 1894 state law that allowed women to vote on issues, but not candidates. Grace Ballentyne, the state's first female lawyer, argued the case before the Iowa Supreme Court. They won and a new referendum was held in November 1908, and it once again passed.

A division occurred in the city council when new members wanted a say as to who the architect would be. In July 1909 the mayor offered a compromise that allowed each member of the council to select an architectural firm to work on the project. The firms were known as the “Associated Architects,” and included: Liebbe, Nourse and Rasmussen, Hallett & Rawson, Wetherell & Gage, and Proudfoot & Bird.

The cornerstone for the new building was laid on June 14, 1910. Charles Weitz’ Sons Construction Company of Des Moines built the building. It was opened to the public on January 1, 1912. Over the years, only a few changes were made to the physical structure, which continues to serve the city government.

Architecture
Des Moines City Hall is a three-story Beaux Arts style building. It is 77 feet wide by 231 feet long. Most of the plans that were drawn up by Proudfoot & Bird were used by the Associated Architects in the final plans. It is a brick structure built on a concrete foundation. The exterior is clad in Bedford stone, which was chosen to match the Old Downtown Des Moines Library and the post office on the west bank of the river. The floors in the vestibules, entrances, public halls and council chambers are covered in marble. Polished Tennessee marble was used for the wainscoting in the public halls, entrances and the Main Hall. Interior woodwork is composed of white oak.

See also
The following are other buildings in the East Village that are listed on the National Register of Historic Places:
Baker-Devotie-Hollingsworth Block
Hohberger Building
Northwestern Hotel
Syndicate Block
Teachout Building

References

Government buildings completed in 1910
Beaux-Arts architecture in Iowa
City and town halls on the National Register of Historic Places in Iowa
Buildings and structures in Des Moines, Iowa
National Register of Historic Places in Des Moines, Iowa
Individually listed contributing properties to historic districts on the National Register in Iowa
City and town halls in Iowa